The 2002/03 Bonaire League (the top association football league in Bonaire, special municipality of Netherlands) season was delayed and later on cancelled due to some internal problems.

The FFB later on decided to organise a warm up championship for the 2003/2004 season. The championship was held with a 7 team round robin followed by a final between the top 2 team. All matches were played in the Antonio Trinidat stadium in Rincon. Real Rincon won the final by defeating Juventus 3-0.

Regular season
Teams face each other 1 time. Top two teams qualify for the final.

Standing

Final

External links
  RSSSF
  Extra

Bonaire League seasons
football
football